Carr-Gomm is a surname. Notable people with the surname include:

Hubert Carr-Gomm (1877–1939), British politician and publisher
Philip Carr-Gomm (born 1952), British spiritual writer
Richard Carr-Gomm (1922-2008), British philanthropist

See also
Carr (surname)
Gomm

Compound surnames
English-language surnames
Surnames of English origin